Thodi Life Thoda Magic is a 2008 Hindi film directed by Aanand L. Rai, and produced by Bhavesh Patel, Akshay Shah & Saahil Chhada. The film stars Jackie Shroff, Parmeet Sethi, Paresh Rawal, Arbaaz Khan and Anita Raj in pivotal roles. Cricket commentator Harsha Bhogle also plays a guest role. The film's music is by Vinay Tiwari.

Cast  
 Jackie Shroff as MK
 Parmeet Sethi as Aditya Singhania
 Anita Raj as Ashima Singhania, Aditya's wife
 Harsha Bhogle as himself (Special Appearance)
 Arbaaz Khan as Roshan Merchant
 Meera Vasudevan as Naina Jairaj
 Saahil Chadha as Siddharth ("Sid")

Soundtrack
The music was composed by Vinay Tiwari and released by T-Series.

References

External links
 
 

2008 films
2000s Hindi-language films
Films directed by Aanand L. Rai